Cassandra Lynn Scerbo (born March 30, 1990) is an American actress, singer and dancer. She was one of the members of the all-girl pop band Slumber Party Girls in the CBS children's music variety series Dance Revolution. In acting, she starred as Brooke in the film Bring It On: In It to Win It (2007), as Lauren Tanner in the ABC Family comedy-drama series Make It or Break It (2009–2012), and as Nova Clarke in the Sharknado film series alongside Ian Ziering and Tara Reid (2013–2018).

Life and career
Scerbo was born on Long Island, New York. She is of full Italian ancestry. Scerbo was raised in Parkland, Florida and played soccer for the Parkland Soccer Club. She lived in Florida from the time she was in kindergarten until she was cast in Make It or Break It. She attended Marjory Stoneman Douglas High School in Parkland. In 2006, Scerbo successfully auditioned for the music girl group Slumber Party Girls. Scerbo was chosen as one of the five members out of over 1,000 fellow applicants. In September 2006, the group hosted the children's music variety series Dance Revolution which promoted nutrition and fitness to children. Slumber Party Girls' original songs were dominantly featured through the series run. The group's debut album Dance Revolution was released but failed to chart. The series was not renewed for a second season. In mid-2007, as the group began working on their second record the group was confirmed to have split. That same year, Scerbo signed a solo-recording contract with Geffen Records. Her three original songs "Betcha Don't Know", "Sugar and Spice" and "Top Of The World" were all released on iTunes in 2008.

In 2007, Universal Pictures has green-lit a planned fourth installment of the Bring It On film series with Scerbo confirmed to star. She portrayed the role of Brooke the team captain of the East Coast Jets Cheerleading squad who have won three years in a row at Camp Spirit-Thunder. It was released direct-to-DVD on December 18, 2007 to generally negative reviews from critics. That same year, Scerbo appeared in the Disney Channel television pilot Arwin!. The pilot was filmed in late-2006 but was not picked up by Disney Channel.

In September 2008, Scerbo starred in the direct-to-DVD comedy film Soccer Mom alongside Missi Pyle and Emily Osment. In June 2009, Scerbo was cast in the ABC Family teen comedy-drama series Make It or Break It which premiered to 2.5 million viewers. Scerbo portrayed the role of a skilled gymnast named Lauren Tanner who aspires to make it to the Olympic Games. Due to the series success ABC Family ordered an additional 10-episodes bringing the first season episode count to 20 episodes. In January 2012, ABC Family renewed the series for a third and final season. The series finale "United Stakes" aired in May 2012. In April 2010, Scerbo also appeared with her Make It or Break It castmate Chelsea Hobbs in an episode of CSI: Miami entitled "Spring Breakdown". The episode aired on April 12, 2010.

In 2011, Scerbo starred in the ABC Family original film Teen Spirit. Scerbo portrayed the role of the Queen Bee of high school who is electrified to death and is not allowed to enter Heaven unless she helps the school's most unpopular girl become prom queen. Filming took place in Wilmington, North Carolina. The film premiered on August 7, 2011 on ABC Family.

In August 2012, Scerbo was announced that she is the godmother to Tiffany Thornton's son.

In 2013, Scerbo starred in the Syfy original film Sharknado as bartender Nova Clarke; she reprised her role in the third installment Sharknado 3: Oh Hell No! in 2015, Sharknado 5: Global Swarming in 2017, and the final installment The Last Sharknado: It's About Time in 2018, in which her character has become a hardened sharknado fighter.

Filmography

Film

Television

Albums
 2006: Dance Revolution (album)

References

External links

 
 Official Music Myspace
 Record Labels Artist site

1990 births
Living people
21st-century American actresses
21st-century American singers
21st-century American women singers
Actresses from Florida
Actresses from Los Angeles
Actresses from New York (state)
American child actresses
American child singers
American female dancers
American film actresses
American people of Italian descent
American television actresses
American voice actresses
Dancers from California
Dancers from Florida
Dancers from New York (state)
People from Long Island
People from Parkland, Florida
Singers from Florida
Singers from Los Angeles
Singers from New York (state)
Slumber Party Girls members